Langendernbach is a village in the municipality Dornburg, Limburg-Weilburg district, Hesse, in western Germany.

Villages in Hesse